Fast Life is the third studio album by Turkish-Belgian singer Hadise. It was released on May 15, 2009 and features the 2009 Eurovision song for Turkey, "Düm Tek Tek".

Singles
 "Düm Tek Tek" ("Boom Bang Bang") was the lead single from Hadise's third album "Fast Life". It was released to Turkey on April 3, 2009, as an EP. The single was the Turkish entry for the Eurovision Song Contest 2009, and came fourth in the contest. 
 "Fast Life" is the official second single. It was released on 15 June 2009.

Track listing

Japanese Edition
The album was re-released under the name of her self named second studio album "Hadise".

Charts

References

2009 albums
Hadise albums